Manganite a mineral composed of manganese oxide-hydroxide, MnO(OH).

Manganite may also refer to:
 Lanthanum manganite, an inorganic compound with the formula LaMnO3
 Lanthanum strontium manganite, an oxide ceramic material
 Potassium manganite